June 26, 1981, Warfield Theatre, San Francisco, CA is a live album by the Jerry Garcia Band.  As the name suggests, it was recorded on June 26, 1981, at the Warfield in San Francisco.  It was released as a digital download on April 1, 2013.  Released after the first and before the second volume of the Garcia Live series of albums, it is sometimes referred to as Garcia Live Volume 1.5.

Track listing
"Mission in the Rain" (Jerry Garcia, Robert Hunter)
"The Harder They Come" (Jimmy Cliff)
"Knockin' on Heaven's Door" (Bob Dylan)
"Dear Prudence" (John Lennon, Paul McCartney)
"Midnight Moonlight" (Peter Rowan)

Personnel
Jerry Garcia – guitar, vocals
Melvin Seals – keyboards
Jimmy Warren – keyboards
Phil Lesh – bass
Daoud Shaw – drums
Essra Mohawk – vocals
Liz Stires – vocals

References

Jerry Garcia Band live albums
2013 live albums
ATO Records live albums